The County of Wied was a territory of the Holy Roman Empire located on the river Wied where it meets the Rhine. Wied emerged as a County earlier than many other German states. From 1243–1462, Wied was united with an Isenburgian County as Isenburg-Wied. Wied was partitioned twice: between itself and Wied-Dierdorf in 1631, and between Wied-Neuwied and Wied-Runkel in 1698. The county was incorporated into the Duchy of Nassau in 1806 and into the Kingdom of Prussia at the Congress of Vienna in 1815. Since 1946, its territory has been part of the German federal state of Rhineland-Palatinate.  Via William of Albania, the House of Wied ruled the Principality of Albania in 1914.

Counts of Wied (c. 860–1243)
Matfried I (c. 860– ?)
Eberhard 
Matfried II  
Richwin II 
Richwin III 
Richwin IV (1093–1112) with...
Matfried III (1093–1129)
Burchard (? –1152) with...
Siegfried (1129–61) with...
Theodoric (1158–89) with...
 George, in 1217-1218 he was a commander of the German crusaders of the 5th crusade
Lothar (? –1243)
To Isenburg-Wied (1243–1462)

Counts of Wied (1462–1698)
Frederick I (1462–87)
William III, Count of Mörs (1487–1526) with...
John I (1487–1533)
Philip (1533–35)
John II (1535–81)
Herman I (1581–91) with...
William IV (1581–1612) with...
Herman II (1581–1631)
Frederick II (1631–98)
Partitioned between Wied-Neuwied and Wied-Runkel

External links
 Map of Wied in 1789
 Héraldique européenne (in French)

States and territories established in 1093
1698 disestablishments
 
Former states and territories of Rhineland-Palatinate
History of the Westerwald